The All India Anna Dravida Munnetra Kazhagam (AIADMK) is an Indian regional political party with great influence in the state of Tamil Nadu and the union territory of Puducherry. It is a Dravidian party founded by the former chief minister of Tamil Nadu M. G. Ramachandran (M.G.R.) at Madurai on 17 October 1972 as a breakaway faction from the Dravida Munnetra Kazhagam after M. Karunanidhi expelled him from the party for demanding an account as the party treasurer. The party is adhering to the policy of socialism and secularism based on the principles of C. N. Annadurai (Anna) collectively coined as Annaism by M.G.R. The party has won a seven-time majority in the Tamil Nadu Legislative Assembly and has emerged as the most successful political outfit in the state's history. It is currently the main opposition party in the Tamil Nadu Legislative Assembly and part of the India-ruling National Democratic Alliance.

From 9 February 1989 to 5 December 2016, the AIADMK was led by the former chief minister of Tamil Nadu J. Jayalalithaa (Amma) as general secretary of the party. She was admired as the Mother of the party by her cadre and was highly popular among the Tamil populace until her death in 2016. From 21 August 2017 to 23 June 2022, the party was led under the dual leadership of the former chief ministers of Tamil Nadu O. Panneerselvam and Edappadi K. Palaniswami as coordinator and joint coordinator respectively.

From 11 July 2022, the AIADMK is led by the former chief minister of Tamil Nadu Edappadi K. Palaniswami (E.P.S.) as general secretary of the party.

The headquarters of the party is called Puratchi Thalaivar M.G.R. Maaligai, which is located at Avvai Shanmugam Salai, Royapettah, Chennai. The building was donated to the party in 1986 by M.G.R.'s wife and the former chief minister of Tamil Nadu V. N. Janaki Ramachandran.

Ideology and policies

The AIADMK sought to depoliticize the education policy of the government by not insisting that education be in the Tamil language. Policies of the AIADMK were targeted at the poorer segments of Tamil society—the poor, rickshaw pullers, and destitute women—and centralising the massive noon meal scheme for children. There was ambivalence toward the reservation policy and the interests of farmers.

The AIADMK posted an array of welfare schemes targeting the human development index of the state. The AIADMK has schemes listed in the election manifestos covering segments of the population, including fishermen, farmers, and schoolchildren. Until the 2000s, the parties had welfare programmes such as maternity leave, subsidies for public transportation, and educational grants. After the 2000s, the parties started competing at an increasing level for the distribution of consumer goods. The AIADMK government distributed free bicycles to class 11 and 12 students during its tenure of 2001–06. In its manifesto for the 2006 assembly elections, the DMK promised free colour televisions in competition with other parties. The competition continued during the 2011 assembly elections, when both parties announced free laptops for school students and mixers, fans, and blenders for the public.

Culture
 The party remains firm in its support for the "two language policy," in opposition to center-left demands to have Hindi as the sole lingua franca language, where Tamil and English are the two main languages of Tamil Nadu.
 The party provided Rs. 1 lakh for temples of local deities in 2016.

Economy
In the spring of 2019, the party lauded the economic policies of the Narendra Modi-led central government, stating that the centre had ushered in economic stability and made the country a "decisive player" in regional economics, and voiced support for the Goods and Services Tax (GST), which had been opposed by their rival the DMK.

Social justice
 In 1980, the AIADMK under M. G. Ramachandran reversed his decision on economic criteria after the AIADMK faced a close defeat in the Indian general election in Tamil Nadu. He further raised the quota for the backward classes from 31 percent to 50 percent, bringing the total reservation to 68 percent.
 In 1993, J. Jayalalithaa's AIADMK government passed the Tamil Nadu Backward Classes, Scheduled Castes, and Scheduled Tribes Bill, 1993 in the Assembly (Act 45 of 1994). The bill was sent to the president for his approval. Jayalalithaa's AIADMK government led a cross-party committee of Tamil Nadu politicians to Delhi to meet with the central government. She also demanded that the Tamil Nadu government's Act be placed in the Constitution's Ninth Schedule, ensuring that it cannot be contested in any court. The president's signature was received, confirming the 69 percent reservation for Tamil Nadu.

State water policy
 In 2006, the AIADMK initiated a case in the Supreme Court to uphold the state's rights on the Mullaperiyar Dam issue. As a result, in May 2014, a Supreme Court verdict allowed the Tamil Nadu State to increase the storage level in the Mullaperiyar Dam to 142 feet from 136 feet and struck down the unconstitutional law enacted by the Government of Kerala in 2006 restricting the storage level to 136 feet. This Supreme Court decision ensured the farmers' and people's livelihoods in the southern districts of Tamil Nadu.
 In February 2013, the Government of India notified the final award of the Cauvery Water Disputes Tribunal (CWDT) on the directions of the Supreme Court. After 22 years of legal battle, then-Chief Minister Jayalalithaa called it a "tremendous achievement" of her government that the state had received due justice. Then Jayalalithaa said that it was the happiest day of her life and the happiest day for the farmers in Tamil Nadu; she recalled her famous fast-unto-death at Marina Beach in 1993.

Environment and nature
 The AIADMK was one of two parties, along with the BJP, to not voice opposition against a ban on cattle slaughter through the national Prevention of Cruelty to Animals Act. However, it has sought an exemption in the Act regarding traditional bull fighting; the party supports popular opinion in Tamil Nadu that traditional bull fighting, known as Jallikattu, should not be banned by the centre due to an APEX court ruling against animal cruelty. During the controversy, the party called for animal-rights organisation PETA to be banned.
In May 2018, the AIADMK government has ordered the closure of the Sterlite Copper factory in Thoothukkudi in the interest of the people, knowing that the air and water in the city are being heavily polluted by the factory, which has been at the center of violent protests by locals to protect and improve the environment.
The AIADMK opposes the building of the Mekedatu Dam, which could reduce water flows into Tamil Nadu and negatively affect quality of life for residents and agriculture.

History

M. G. Ramachandran era (17 October 1972 – 24 December 1987)

The party was founded on 17 October 1972, as Anna Dravida Munnetra Kazhagam (ADMK) by M. G. Ramachandran (M.G.R.), a veteran Tamil film star and popular politician. It was set up as a breakaway faction of the DMK led by M. Karunanidhi, owing to personal differences between the two. M.G.R., who wanted to start a new party, then incorporated Anakaputhur Ramalingam into the party, which had registered under the name "ADMK". He then declared, "I joined the party started by an ordinary volunteer" and gave the post of Member of Legislative Council (MLC) to Ramalingam. Later, M.G.R. prefixed the All India (AI) tag to the party's name to protect the party during the Maintenance of Internal Security Act (MISA). Since its inception, the relationship between the AIADMK and DMK has been marked by mutual contempt. M.G.R. used his fan network to build the party cadre; he claims his party recruited more than a million members in the first two months. C. N. Annadurai's ideologue and movie producer turned politician R. M. Veerappan was the key architect in unifying M.G.R. fan clubs and further consolidating the party structure in the 1970s. Other key leaders, such as Nanjil K. Manoharan and S. D. Somasundaram played major roles in consolidation. Pavalar M. Muthusamy was elected the first presidium chairman of the party. The party's first victories were the wins of Maya Thevar in the Dindigul parliamentary bye-election in May 1973 and of C. Aranganayagam in the Coimbatore West assembly bye-election a year later. On 2 April 1973, the AIADMK emerged as the third-largest political party in Tamil Nadu, represented by 11 MLAs in the assembly. By January 1976, the AIADMK had emerged as the second-largest political party in Tamil Nadu, with 16 MLAs in the assembly. By supporting the National Emergency between 1975 and 1977, the AIADMK grew close to the Indian National Congress party.

The DMK-led government was dismissed by a central government on corruption charges in 1976. The AIADMK swept to power, defeating the DMK in the 1977 assembly election. M.G.R. was sworn in as the third chief minister of Tamil Nadu on 30 June 1977. In the 1977 general election, the party won 18 seats. In 1979, the AIADMK became the first Dravidian and regional party to join the Union Cabinet. Sathiavani Muthu and A. Bala Pajanor were the members of parliament who joined the short-lived Union Ministry led by then-prime minister Charan Singh.

The relationship between the AIADMK and the INC slowly became strained. In the 1980 general election, the INC aligned with the DMK, and the alliance won 37 out of the 39 state parliamentary seats. The AIADMK won just two seats. After returning to power, Indira Gandhi dismissed a number of state governments belonging to the opposition parties, including the AIADMK government in Tamil Nadu.

In the 1980 assembly election, with the opposition DMK continuing the electoral alliance with the INC, In a massive reversal of fortunes following the Lok Sabha elections, the AIADMK won a comfortable majority in the state assembly with 129 of 234 seats. M.G.R. was sworn in as chief minister for the second time on 9 June 1980.

In the 1984 general election, the party again aligned with the INC, and the alliance won 37 out of the 39 state parliamentary seats. In the 1984 assembly election, even with M.G.R.'s failing health and hospitalization, the party won the election in alliance with the INC. Many political historians consider M.G.R.'s persona and charisma at this point in time as "infallible" and a logical continuation of his on-screen "good lad" image, strengthened by his "mythical status" in the minds of the masses. M.G.R. continued to enjoy popular support in his third term until his death. He died on 24 December 1987, and became the second chief minister in Tamil Nadu to die in office after Anna.

Succession crisis (25 December 1987 – 6 February 1989)
Following M.G.R.'s death, his wife, actress-turned-politician V. N. Janaki Ramachandran, rose to the party's leadership with the support of R. M. Veerappan and 98 MLAs. She served as the state's first female chief minister for 23 days, from 7 January 1988 until the state assembly was suspended on 30 January 1988 and President's Rule was imposed. The party began to crumble due to infighting and broke into two factions, one under Janaki Ramachandran and the other under J. Jayalalithaa, an associate of M.G.R. and another film actress-turned-politician who had starred with M.G.R. The Election Commission of India froze the "Two Leaves" symbol on 17 December 1988. The 1989 assembly election saw the DMK regain power after 13 years in opposition, with M. Karunanidhi returning as the chief minister for the third time. Due to its split, the AIADMK suffered heavily in the election, with the Janaki and Jayalalithaa factions winning only 2 and 27 seats, respectively. Following AIADMK's rout in the election, the factions led by Jayalalithaa and Janaki merged under the former's leadership on 7 February 1989, as Janaki decided that politics was not her forte. On 8 February 1989, then Chief Election Commissioner R. V. S. Peri Sastri granted the Two Leaves symbol to the united AIADMK Party led by Jayalalithaa. In the 1989 general election, the AIADMK formed an alliance with the Indian National Congress and won 38 out of 39 seats in Tamil Nadu. The DMK government was dismissed in 1991 by the central government headed by then-prime minister Chandra Shekhar, an ally of the AIADMK at that time, on charges that the constitutional machinery in the state had broken down.

J. Jayalalithaa era (9 February 1989 – 5 December 2016)

On 9 February 1989, the AIADMK, led by J. Jayalalithaa, became the main opposition party in the Tamil Nadu Legislative Assembly, and she became the first female leader of the opposition in the assembly. The party allied with the Indian National Congress (INC) and swept to power in the 1991 assembly election under her leadership, and she became the second female and fifth chief minister of the state. Political observers have ascribed the landslide victory to the anti-incumbent wave arising out of the assassination of the former prime minister Rajiv Gandhi by suspected Tamil separatists fighting for a homeland in neighbouring Sri Lanka. The ensuing government was accused of large-scale corruption, but Jayalalithaa held on to power for a full term of five years.

In the 1996 assembly election, the AIADMK continued its alliance with the INC but suffered a massive rout, winning only 4 out of the 234 assembly seats, with even the party's general secretary Jayalalithaa losing in the Bargur constituency. The party lost the 1996 general election by losing all the constituencies it contested.

During the 1998 general election, the AIADMK formed an alliance with the Bharatiya Janata Party (BJP) and Marumalarchi Dravida Munnetra Kazhagam (MDMK). In the Atal Bihari Vajpayee-led government between 1998 and 1999, the AIADMK shared power with the BJP but withdrew support in early 1999, causing the BJP government to fall. Following this, the AIADMK once again allied with the INC in the 1999 general election, and the alliance won 13 seats out of 39 in Tamil Nadu.

In the 2001 assembly election, the AIADMK-led alliance, consisting of the Indian National Congress, the Tamil Maanila Congress (Moopanar) (TMC(M)), the Left Front, and the Pattali Makkal Katchi (PMK), regained power, winning 197 seats to the AIADMK's 132. Due to the proceedings in a disproportionate asset case that occurred during her previous tenure, Jayalalithaa was prevented from holding office. On 21 September 2001, O. Panneerselvam, a close confidant of Jayalalithaa, was appointed as the chief minister of Tamil Nadu for the first time. Once the Supreme Court of India overturned Jayalalithaa's conviction and sentence in the case, O. Panneerselvam resigned on 2 March 2002, and Jayalalithaa was again sworn in as chief minister for the third time.

Her second term was not marred by corruption scandals. She took many popular decisions, such as banning lottery tickets, restricting the liquor and sand quarrying businesses to government agencies, and banning tobacco product sales near schools and colleges. She encouraged women to join the state police force by setting up all women's police stations and commissioning 150 women into the elite level police commandos in 2003, a first in India. The women had the same training as men, which included handling weapons, detection and disposal of bombs, driving, horseback riding, and adventure sports. She dispatched a special task force to the Sathyamangalam forests in October 2004 to track down notorious sandalwood smuggler Veerappan. The operation was successful, as he was killed by the task force on 18 October 2004.

However, despite the popular measures taken by the government, in the 2004 general election, the party, in alliance with the BJP again, was humiliated, winning none of the 39 Lok Sabha seats from the state. The Secular Progressive Alliance (SPA), a DMK-led alliance consisting of all the major opposition parties in the state, swept the election.

Later, in the 2006 assembly election, in spite of media speculations of a hung assembly, the AIADMK, contesting with only the support of the MDMK and a few other smaller parties, won 61 seats compared to the DMK's 96 and was pushed out of power by the DMK-led congressional alliance of the PMK and the Left Front. The AIADMK's electoral reversals continued in the 2009 general election. However, the party's performance was better than its debacle in 2004, and it managed to win nine seats.

Following widespread corruption, a price rise, a power cut, and allegations of nepotism against the DMK government, in the 2011 assembly election, the party, in alliance with parties like the left and actor-turned-politician Vijayakant's Desiya Murpokku Dravida Kazhagam (DMDK), swept the polls, winning 202 seats, with the AIADMK winning 150. Jayalalithaa was sworn in as chief minister for the fourth time.

In the union territory of Puducherry, the AIADMK allied with N. Rangasamy's All India N.R. Congress (AINRC) and won the 2011 assembly election, which was held in parallel with the Tamil Nadu assembly election. Rangasamy, on the other hand, formed the government without consulting the AIADMK and refused to share power with the pre-election alliance partner. So Jayalalithaa accused him of betraying the coalition.

The AIADMK's good electoral performance continued in the 2014 general election as well. It opted not to join any alliance and contested all seats in the state of Tamil Nadu and the union territory of Puducherry on its own. The party won an unprecedented 37 out of the 40 parliamentary constituencies it contested and emerged as the third largest party in the 16th Lok Sabha of the Indian Parliament. It was a massive victory that no other regional political party had ever achieved in the history of general elections.

On 29 August 2014, J. Jayalalithaa was elected as the general secretary of the party for the 7th consecutive term, making her the longest-serving general secretary of the party to date. Earlier, she was elected in the years 1988, 1989, 1993, 1998, 2003, 2008, and 2014. During her longest tenure as general secretary, V. R. Nedunchezhiyan, K. Kalimuthu, Pulamaipithan, C. Ponnaiyan, and E. Madhusudhanan served as the presidium chairmen of the party.

On 27 September 2014, Jayalalithaa was convicted in the disproportionate assets case by a Special Court along with her associates V. K. Sasikala, Ilavarasi, and V. N. Sudhakaran and sentenced to four years' simple imprisonment. Jayalalithaa was also fined 100 crore, and her associates were fined 10 crore each. The case had political implications as it was the first time a ruling chief minister had to step down on account of a court sentence.

Due to her resignation, O. Panneerselvam was sworn in as chief minister on 29 September 2014. Jayalalithaa was denied bail by the High Court and moved the Supreme Court for bail. The Supreme Court granted bail on 17 October 2014. On 11 May 2015, the High Court of Karnataka said she was acquitted from that case and was again sworn in as chief minister for the fifth time.

In the 2016 assembly election, running without allies, she swept the polls, winning 135 out of 234 seats. It was the most audacious decision made by her for the spectacular victory that no other political leader had ever made in the history of Tamil Nadu. On 23 May 2016, Jayalalithaa was sworn in as chief minister for the sixth time.

On 22 September 2016, she was admitted to Apollo Hospital, Chennai, due to fever and dehydration. After a prolonged illness, she died on 5 December 2016, and became the third chief minister in Tamil Nadu to die in office after Anna and her mentor M.G.R.

Expansion beyond Tamil Nadu and Puducherry
Under Jayalalithaa's regime, the party spread beyond Tamil Nadu and Puducherry. State units are established in Karnataka and Kerala. The party also has functionaries in places like the Andaman and Nicobar Islands, Andhra Pradesh, Maharashtra, the National Capital Territory of Delhi, and Telangana in India, as well as in other countries where Tamil people are present.

In Karnataka, the party had members in the state assembly from 1983 to 2004 and has influence in the Tamil-speaking areas of Bengaluru and Kolar.

In Andhra Pradesh, Kerala, and Maharashtra, the party contested some legislative assembly elections but did not win a single seat in any of the elections.

V. K. Sasikala and T. T. V. Dhinakaran era (31 December 2016 – 17 February 2017)
After Jayalalithaa's death on 5 December 2016, her close aide V. K. Sasikala was selected unanimously as the Acting General Secretary of the party on 31 December 2016. On 5 February 2017, she was selected as the leader of the legislative assembly as chief minister. O. Panneerselvam rebelled against Sasikala and reported that he had been compelled to resign as Chief Minister, bringing in a new twist to Tamil Nadu politics. Due to a conviction in the disproportionate assets case against Jayalalithaa, Sasikala was sentenced to 4 years' imprisonment in the Bengaluru Central Prison. Before that, she appointed Edappadi K. Palaniswami as legislative party leader (Chief Minister).

She also appointed her nephew and former treasurer of the party, T. T. V. Dhinakaran, as the deputy general secretary of the AIADMK party. With the support of 123 MLAs, Palaniswami became chief minister of Tamil Nadu.

On 23 March 2017, the Election Commission of India (ECI) gave separate party symbols to the two factions: O. Panneerselvam's faction, known as AIADMK (PURATCHI THALAIVI AMMA), and Edappadi K. Palaniswami's faction, known as AIADMK (AMMA).

By-polls were announced in the Dr. Radhakrishnan Nagar constituency, which was vacated due to Jayalalithaa's death. But the election commission cancelled the by-polls after evidence of large-scale bribery by the ruling AIADMK (AMMA) surfaced. On 17 April 2017, Delhi police registered a case against Dhinakaran, who was also the candidate for AIADMK (AMMA) for the by-election at Dr. Radhakrishnan Nagar, regarding an allegation of attempting to bribe the Election Commission of India for the AIADMK's election symbol. However, the Central District Tis Hazari Courts granted him bail on the grounds that the police had failed to identify the allegedly bribed public official.

T. T. V. Dhinakaran started his party work on 5 August 2017. However, the chief minister, Edappadi K. Palaniswami, had a fallout with Dhinakaran and announced that the appointment of Dinakaran as deputy general secretary was invalid. So he claims, "We are the real AIADMK, and 95% of its cadres are with us."

Expulsion of V. K. Sasikala and T. T. V. Dhinakaran
On 12 September 2017, the AIADMK general council, which had earlier appointed her, cancelled V. K. Sasikala's appointment as general secretary and officially expelled her from the party as a primary member.

Earlier on 10 August 2017, T. T. V. Dhinakaran was sacked as deputy general secretary at the meeting headed by Edappadi K. Palaniswami at Puratchi Thalaivar M.G.R. Maaligai in Chennai.

After completing her imprisonment at Bengaluru Central Prison, Sasikala filed a case in the City Civil Court IV of Chennai in February 2021, but it upheld her dismissal as the AIADMK general secretary in April 2022.

O. Panneerselvam and Edappadi K. Palaniswami era (21 August 2017 – 23 June 2022)
On 21 August 2017, both O. Panneerselvam and Edappadi K. Palaniswami factions of the AIADMK merged, and O. Panneerselvam was sworn in as the Deputy Chief Minister of Tamil Nadu with the portfolio of Finance and the coordinator of the AIADMK. He also holds portfolios for housing, rural housing, housing development, the slum clearance board, accommodation control, town planning, urban development, and the Chennai Metropolitan Development Authority. On 4 January 2018, O. Panneerselvam was elected Leader of the House in the Tamil Nadu Legislative Assembly.

On 12 September 2017, the AIADMK general council decided to cancel V. K. Sasikala's appointment as acting general secretary and officially expel her from the party, though prominent members appointed to party posts by her were allowed to continue discharging their functions. Instead, the late J. Jayalalithaa was named the eternal general secretary of the AIADMK.

A day after the merger of two AIADMK factions, on 22 April 2017, 19 MLAs owing allegiance to ousted deputy general secretary T. T. V. Dhinakaran submitted letters to the governor, expressing lack of confidence in Chief Minister Edappadi K. Palaniswami and withdrawing support from the government. 18 out of those 19 MLAs were disqualified from office by the Speaker of the legislative assembly upon recommendation from the AIADMK Chief Whip. After a prolonged legal battle, the Speaker's orders were upheld by the Madras High Court, and bye-elections were held alongside the general parliamentary elections. On 23 November 2017, the Election Commission of India granted the "two leaves" symbol to the O. Panneerselvam and Edappadi K. Palaniswami camp.

On 14 November 2017, the AIADMK launched News J, named after the AIADMK former general secretary J. Jayalalithaa, to replace Jaya TV. On 24 February 2018, AIADMK's new mouthpiece, Namadhu Amma, a Tamil daily, was launched, marking the 70th birth anniversary of the AIADMK former general secretary J. Jayalalithaa.

Despite the popular measures taken by the government, in the 2019 Lok Sabha election, the party, in alliance with the BJP again, was humiliated, winning one of the 39 Lok Sabha seats from the state. The Secular Progressive Alliance (SPA), a DMK-led alliance consisting of all the major opposition parties in the state, swept the election by winning 38 seats.

Later, in the 2021 assembly election, the AIADMK, which had the support of the same National Democratic Alliance (NDA) and a few other smaller parties, won 66 seats compared to the DMK's 133 seats and was pushed out of power by the DMK-led secular progressive alliance. After the election, the AIADMK emerged as the main party of the opposition in the assembly. On 11 May 2021, party joint coordinator Edappadi K. Palaniswami was recognized as the Leader of the Opposition in the Tamil Nadu Legislative Assembly, and on 14 June 2021, party coordinator O. Panneerselvam was recognized as the Deputy Leader of the Opposition in the Tamil Nadu Legislative Assembly by M. Appavu, Speaker of the Assembly.

Legal Fight for the party by V. K. Sasikala and T. T. V. Dhinakaran
After that, V. K. Sasikala and T. T. V. Dhinakaran had appealed to the Delhi High Court, which rejected their appeal and said that O. Panneerselvam and Edappadi K. Palaniswami were the original AIADMK.

Following that, T. T. V. Dhinakaran filed an appeal with the Supreme Court of India on March 15, and the bench of the Chief Justice of India dismissed his appeal against the Delhi High Court's decision in favor of the O. Panneerselvam and Edappadi K. Palaniswami camp.

Following this, the General Council passed a resolution removing V. K. Sasikala from the post of General Secretary. V. K. Sasikala and T. T. V. Dhinakaran jointly filed a suit in the High Court challenging the decision of the General Council. Since it was a civil case, the case was transferred to the City Civil Court. During the hearing on 9 April 2021, Dinakaran told the court that he would withdraw from the case as he had started a party called Amma Makkal Munnettra Kazagam. At the same time, Sasikala told the court that she wanted to continue the case. The court dismissed her plea following an interlocutory application from AIADMK Coordinator O. Panneerselvam and Joint Coordinator Edappadi K. Palaniswami.

Tensions with BJP
In June 2022, the AIADMK and BJP were at odds publicly. AIADMK organisation secretary C. Ponnaiyan accused the BJP-led Central government of stealing Tamil Nadu's revenue, as well as blaming AIADMK for election losses, the loss of minority community support, and "anti-Tamil" policies, particularly those affecting students. He also called the alliance an "electoral adjustment," claiming that the BJP was attempting to expand at the cost of the AIADMK in Tamil Nadu and that its ideology is diametrically opposite that of the AIADMK. The event reportedly had party cadres reiterating these sentiments, albeit in a lighter tone, and agreeing that the BJP was attempting to wrest control of the state's opposition from the AIADMK.

Leadership tussle between O.P.S. and E.P.S.
On 14 June 2022, citing the party's troubles in the polls, AIADMK district secretaries and other senior party members spoke out to shun the "dual leadership" system and came out publicly in favor of a strong unitary leader to strengthen the organisation.

Supporters of Edappadi K. Palaniswami pushed for the change in the party's leadership structure by staging a political coup against AIADMK Coordinator O. Panneerselvam, who had become weak within the party. According to many sources, of the AIADMK's 75 district secretaries, hardly 10 supported him. Of the party's 66 MLAs, only three were reportedly on O. Panneerselvam's side, and less than 20 percent of the party's general council members were behind him ahead of the crucial general council meeting on 23 June 2022, which was expected to elect the single leadership to the party.

On 23 June 2022, A. Tamil Magan Hussain was unanimously elected as the Presidium Chairman of the party at a general council meeting held at the Shrivaaru Venkataachalapathy Palace in Vanagaram, Chennai. On the same day, Presidium Chairman Tamil Magan Hussain announced that the next general council meeting of the party would be held on 11 July 2022.

On 30 June 2022, Edappadi K. Palaniswami wrote a letter to O. Panneerselvam asserting the latter ceased to be the party coordinator as the amendments made to the party's bylaw in the December 2020 executive committee meeting were not recognised in the general council meeting held on 23 June 2022.

Edappadi K. Palaniswami era (11 July 2022 – Present)

On 11 July 2022, an AIADMK general council meeting was held at the Shrivaaru Venkataachalapathy Palace in Vanagaram following the dismissal of a petition by O. Panneerselvam in the Madras High Court. The party general council abolished the dual leadership model, empowered Edappadi K. Palaniswami as the interim general secretary, and called for organisational elections in 4 months. Before the general council meeting, there was violence at the Puratchi Thalaivar M.G.R. Maaligai in Royapettah, where the supporters of Palaniswami and Panneerselvam threw stones, bottles, and plastic chairs at each other and damaged several vehicles nearby. Following this, the Revenue Department of Tamil Nadu sealed the Puratchi Thalaivar M.G.R. Maaligai. Overall, 47 people were injured in the clashes.

The general council meeting made 20 amendments to the AIADMK bylaws, including the removal of rule 20, which had described J. Jayalalithaa as the "eternal general secretary," reviving the post of general secretary, transferring all the powers of the coordinator and joint coordinator to the general secretary, and abolishing the posts of coordinator and joint coordinator. These changes effectively ended the party's dual leadership.

Expulsion of O. Panneerselvam
In the general council meeting held on 11 July 2022, the general council members passed the resolution and expelled the former coordinator O. Panneerselvam, the former deputy coordinator R. Vaithilingam, P. H. Manoj Pandian, and J. C. D. Prabhakar from their respective posts and primary membership in the party for "anti-party" activities.

On 11 July 2022, former chief minister of Tamil Nadu Edappadi K. Palaniswami was unanimously elected as the interim general secretary of the party in the general council meeting held at the Shrivaaru Venkatachalapathy Palace in Vanagaram, Chennai. Palaniswami appointed Dindigul C. Srinivasan as the treasurer of the party, replacing O. Panneerselvam. On 19 July 2022, Palaniswami appointed R. B. Udhayakumar as the deputy leader of the opposition in the Tamil Nadu Legislative Assembly, replacing Panneerselvam, who declared this in the party's legislative members meeting held on 17 July 2022.

On 20 July 2022, the Madras High Court ordered to remove the seal of Puratchi Thalaivar M.G.R. Maaligai and hand over the keys to the interim general secretary, Edappadi K. Palaniswami. It was previously locked and sealed on 11 July 2022. On 12 September 2022, the Supreme Court of India dismissed the petition of O. Panneerselvam challenging the Madras High Court's order to handover the keys to Palaniswami.

Legal Fight for the party between Palaniswami and Panneerselvam 
The Madras High Court on 17 August 2022 ruled in favor of O. Panneerselvam and declared the AIADMK general council meeting held on 11 July 2022 which had abolished dual leadership as void ab initio. The court called for the restoration of the status quo as it existed on June 23 and has prevented the party from convening any meeting of the executive council or the general council of the party without joint consent from both Palaniswami and Panneerselvam, thus effectively restoring dual leadership. The court cited procedural lapses to declare the general council meeting held on July 11, invalid and found that there was no data to prove Edappadi K. Palaniswami's claim that 95% of the 1.5 crore (15 million) primary party members supported unitary leadership under him.

Edappadi K. Palaniswami appealed the single-judge court order to a larger bench of judges. Following the order, O. Panneerselvam appealed for party unity, which included the splinter AMMK group. Palaniswami dismissed this appeal as a power-hungry move by Panneerselvam and held him responsible for violence at the Puratchi Thalaivar M.G.R. Maaligai.

On 2 September 2022, a division bench of the Madras High Court upheld the decisions of the AIADMK general council meeting held on 11 July 2022, and set aside the previous court order of the single judge in the appeal case of Edappadi K. Palaniswami, thus effectively restoring unitary leadership.

On 23 February 2023, the Supreme Court of India upheld the decisions of the AIADMK general council meeting held on 11 July 2022, and dismissed the petition of O. Panneerselvam challenging the previous order of the division bench, thus affirming unitary leadership under Edappadi K. Palaniswami.

Electoral performance

Indian general elections

State legislative assembly elections

Current office bearers and prominent members

List of party leaders

Presidents

General Secretaries

Coordinators

Legislative leaders

List of union cabinet ministers

List of chief ministers

Chief Ministers of Tamil Nadu

Chief Minister of Puducherry

List of deputy chief ministers

Deputy Chief Minister of Tamil Nadu

List of deputy speakers of the Lok Sabha

List of union ministers of state

List of speakers

Speakers of the Tamil Nadu Legislative Assembly

Speakers of the Puducherry Legislative Assembly

List of deputy speakers

Deputy speakers of the Tamil Nadu Legislative Assembly

List of leaders of the opposition

Leaders of the Opposition in the Tamil Nadu Legislative Assembly

Leaders of the Opposition in the Puducherry Legislative Assembly

List of deputy leaders of the opposition

Deputy leaders of the Opposition in the Tamil Nadu Legislative Assembly

See also

 Politics of India
 List of political parties in India

References

 .
 .
 .
 .
 .
 .

External links
 
 AIADMK on YouTube
 AIADMK on Twitter
 AIADMK on Facebook

All India Anna Dravida Munnetra Kazhagam
1972 establishments in Tamil Nadu
Dravidian political parties
Democratic socialist parties in Asia
State political parties in Tamil Nadu
State political parties in Puducherry
Populist parties
Political parties established in 1972
Regionalist parties in India
Socialist parties in India